The Embassy of the Russian Federation in Dar es Salaam is the diplomatic mission of Russia in Tanzania.

See also
 Diplomatic missions of Russia

References

External links
 

Russia
Dar es Salaam
Russia–Tanzania relations